Moslem Mesigar (born 17 September 1984) is an Iranian beach soccer player. He plays in Forward position.

Honours

Beach soccer
 Iran
'FIFA Beach Soccer World Cup Third place: 2017Beach Soccer Intercontinental Cup winner: 2013Asian Championship winner : 2013,2017 Third place: 2011, 2008Asian Beach Games winner: 2012, Third place: 2010

IndividualTop Scorer''': 2013 AFC Beach Soccer Championship

References 

1984 births
Living people
Iranian beach soccer players